Ancona Cathedral (Basilica Cattedrale Metropolitana di San Ciriaco) is a Roman Catholic cathedral in Ancona, central Italy, dedicated to Saint Cyriacus. It is the seat of the Archbishop of Ancona. The building is an example of mixed Romanesque-Byzantine and Gothic elements, and stands on the site of the former acropolis of the Greek city, the Guasco hill which overlooks Ancona and its gulf.

History
Excavations carried on in 2016 proved that an Italic temple, perhaps dedicated to Aphrodite, existed on the site as early as the 3rd century BC. On top of it, in the 6th century AD, a Palaeo-Christian church was built: this had a nave and three aisles with the entrance facing south-east (where the current Chapel of the Crucifix is). Some remains of it still in existence include a mosaic pavement and perimeter walls.

In 995–1015 a new church was built, which kept the original walls. In 1017 the renovated basilica received the relics of Saint Marcellinus of Ancona and Saint Cyriacus. Further enlargement works occurred between the late 12th and the early 13th centuries, with the addition of a transept to obtain a Greek cross plan, and an entrance towards the south-west, resulting in the church now facing the port and the new road entering the city. The transepts were at a higher level than the previous nave, and had apses. The church, previously dedicated to Saint Lawrence, was re-dedicated to Saint Cyriacus the Martyr, the patron saint and (possibly) bishop of Ancona.

In 1883 the basilica underwent a very impressive restoration by Giuseppe Sacconi, future superintendent of the monuments of the Marches and Umbria from 1891 to 1902 and author of the project of the Vittoriano. He restored it to its original austere medieval appearance, eliminating the decorations and overlapping plasters, which over the centuries had altered the original appearance of the church.

During World War I, on 24 May 1915, the basilica was damaged by a bombardment of the Austro-Hungarian fleet. The damage was restored in 1920, but in World War II Anglo-American aerial bombings destroyed the south transept and the Crypt of Tears under it, along with the art objects housed there. Once the transept was rebuilt, the church was officially reopened in 1951. Further damage was caused by an earthquake in 1972, followed by a new restoration and another official opening in 1977.

In 1926 the cathedral was declared a minor basilica.

Description

Exterior
The edifice is built in white stone from Mount Conero, with apses protruding from the transept's ends and an elevated body, with a dome at the crossing, in correspondence to the nave. All the external surfaces feature a decoration of Lombard bands. The bell tower is in an isolated position. It is mentioned from 1314 and was built above a pre-existing late 13th-century tower.

The façade, divided into three section, is preceded by a wide staircase; above it is a 13th-century Romanesque portal formed by a round arch supported by four columns. The anterior ones stand on lions in Veronese red marble, while the rear ones, added later by Luigi Vanvitelli, are on a simple pedestal.

Under the arches are four reliefs depicting the symbols of the Evangelists. The portal is attributed to Giorgio da Como (c. 1228), and is in Romanesque-Gothic style, built in Conero white stone from Mount Conero and Veronese red marble. It is decorated by a series of columns holding ogival arches with reliefs of saints' busts, animal figures and vegetable motifs. Above the portal is a large oculus with a Romanesque frame between two single mullioned windows.

The dome is one of the most ancient in Italy. It has an ogival shape with a dodecagonal drum, standing on a square base with small decorative arches. It was built over the crossing in the 13th century, and is attributed to Margaritone d'Arezzo (1270). Together with the church of Sant'Antonio at Padua and St. Mark's Basilica in Venice, it was one of the few contemporary examples of domes built in churches, instead than in separate baptisteries. The copper cover was added in the 16th century.

Interior
The interior is on the Greek cross plan. All the arms are divided into a nave and two aisles, with re-used antique Roman columns with Byzantine capitals. At the crossing is the internal part of the dome, which has pendentives with Byzantine-style figures of praying angels. The dome is supported by cruciform cluster piers.

The side arms of the transept end in elevated apses, while the central arm of the presbytery lost the original apse during the enlargement works of the 18th century. All the naves have hull-shaped, painted wooden vaults dating from the 15th century. At the beginning of the northern nave is the monument to a Fermo warrior from 1530.

The south transept is home to the Chapel of the Crucifix. Its screens (transennae) are formed by tiles with sgraffito decoration from a balustrade of 1189. They depict, on the left, Jeremiah and Habakkuk; the Eternal Father and the Blessed Virgin; an angel and Saint John the Evangelist; and Saint Cyriacus; and, on the right, figures of animals: two cranes on a pomegranate tree, an eagle, two peacocks on a tree and two gryphons. In the Crypt of Tears below, rebuilt after the devastation of World War II, are remains of ancient structures. The presbytery's arms house, in the northern aisles, the sepulchre of Blessed Girolamo Ginelli (d. 1506), made in 1509 by Giovanni Dalmata.

The northern transept houses the Madonna Chapel, with a lavishly decorated niche designed by Luigi Vanvitelli in 1739, which is the site of a venerated 17th century image of the Madonna. Under the chapel is a crypt with the remains of Saint Cyriacus (in a marble case), Saints Liberius and Marcellinus (in Sicilian jasper) and the ashes of Saint Palatia. The urns with bronze festoons were designed and executed between 1757 and 1760 by Gioacchino Varlè.

Photos

See also
Roman Catholic Archdiocese of Ancona-Osimo

Sources

External links
Page at Medioevo.org art website 

Religious buildings and structures completed in 1017
11th-century Roman Catholic church buildings in Italy
Roman Catholic churches in Ancona
Romanesque architecture in le Marche
Gothic architecture in le Marche
Byzantine architecture
Roman Catholic cathedrals in Italy
Cathedrals in the Marche
Minor basilicas in Marche
Church buildings with domes